Vadim Bejenari is a Moldovan professional footballer who plays as a midfielder.

Football career
Bejenari made his professional debut for Zimbru on 9 April 2016 against Dinamo-Auto, coming on as an 88th-minute substitute in a 2–1 win at the Zimbru Stadium.

References

External links
  
Vadim Bejenari at UEFA.com

Notes

1997 births
Living people
Moldovan footballers
Moldovan Super Liga players
FC Zimbru Chișinău players
CS Petrocub Hîncești players
Association football midfielders
Real Succes Chișinău players